Verry is a surname. Notable people with the surname include:

George F. Verry (1826–1883), American politician
Norm Verry (1922–1961), American football player and coach
Ross Verry (born 1964), New Zealand cricketer

See also
McVerry
Terry